Eli Matheson (born 12 July 1983 in Lithgow, New South Wales) is a field hockey striker who represented Australia at the 2008 Summer Olympics in Beijing. He currently works as an architectural model maker in Perth.

References

External links
 
 Eli Matheson at Australian Olympic Committee

1983 births
Living people
Australian male field hockey players
Olympic field hockey players of Australia
Olympic bronze medalists for Australia
Field hockey players at the 2008 Summer Olympics
People from the Central Tablelands
Olympic medalists in field hockey
World Series Hockey players
Sportsmen from New South Wales
Medalists at the 2008 Summer Olympics